The Cremenița is a left tributary of the river Răchita in Romania. It flows into the Răchita in Urcu.

References

Rivers of Romania
Rivers of Caraș-Severin County